Arpa Pairee Ke Dhaar ("Streams of Arpa and Pairi") is the state song of the Indian state of Chhattisgarh. It was composed by Narendra Dev Verma and was officially adopted in November 2019. The title of the anthem references the two main rivers of the state, the Arpa River and the Pairi River.

Lyrics

See also
 List of Indian state songs

References

External links
अरपा पैरी के धार, महानदी हे अपार पूरा गीत देखें
Arpa Pairi Ke Dhar
Know, अरपा…पैरी के धार गीत से मुख्यममंत्री के ससुर का क्या है नाता
Arpa Pairi Ke Dhar Cg Song
अरपा पैरी के धार lyrics in Hindi - English

Indian state songs
Symbols of Chhattisgarh